Axial multipole moments are a series expansion of the electric potential of a charge distribution localized close to the origin along one Cartesian axis, denoted here as the z-axis. For clarity, we first illustrate the expansion for a single point charge, then generalize to an arbitrary charge density  localized to the z-axis.

Axial multipole moments of a point charge

If the radius r of the observation point is greater than a, we may factor out  and expand the square root in powers of  using Legendre polynomials

where the axial multipole moments  contain everything specific to a given charge distribution; the other parts of the electric potential depend only on the coordinates of the observation point P.  Special cases include the axial monopole moment , the axial dipole moment  and the axial quadrupole moment .  This illustrates the general theorem that the lowest non-zero multipole moment is independent of the origin of the coordinate system, but higher multipole moments are not (in general).

where the interior axial multipole moments  contain everything specific to a given charge distribution; the other parts depend only on the coordinates of the observation point P.

General axial multipole moments

To get the general axial multipole moments, we replace the point charge of the previous section with an infinitesimal charge element , where  represents the charge density at position  on the z-axis.

where the axial multipole moments  are defined

Special cases include the axial monopole moment (=total charge)

the axial dipole moment , and the axial quadrupole moment . Thus, at large distances, the potential is well-approximated by the leading nonzero multipole term.

The lowest non-zero axial multipole moment is invariant under a shift b in origin, but higher moments generally depend on the choice of origin.  The shifted multipole moments  would be

Expanding the polynomial under the integral

leads to the equation

If the lower moments  are zero, then .  The same equation shows that multipole moments higher than the first non-zero moment do depend on the choice of origin (in general).

Interior axial multipole moments

where the interior axial multipole moments  are defined

Special cases include the interior axial monopole moment ( the total charge)

the interior axial dipole moment , etc. At short distances, the potential is well-approximated by the leading nonzero interior multipole term.

See also

 Potential theory
 Multipole expansion
 Spherical multipole moments
 Cylindrical multipole moments
 Solid harmonics
 Laplace expansion

References

Electromagnetism
Potential theory
Moment (physics)